The Ambassador Extraordinary and Plenipotentiary of the Russian Federation to the Hashemite Kingdom of Jordan is the official representative of the President and the Government of the Russian Federation to the King and the Government of Jordan.

The ambassador and his staff work at large in the Embassy of Russia in Amman.

History of diplomatic relations

Diplomatic relations between the Soviet Union and Jordan were established on 20 August 1963.  was appointed ambassador on 30 January 1964. With the dissolution of the Soviet Union in 1991, the government of Jordan recognized the Russian Federation as its successor. The Soviet ambassador, Yuri Gryadunov, continued as representative of the Russian Federation until 1992.

List of representatives (1964 – present)

Representatives of the Soviet Union to Jordan (1964 – 1991)

Representatives of the Russian Federation to Jordan (1991 – present)

References 

 
Jordan
Russia